Pokémon, known in Japan as Pocket Monsters (ポケットモンスター, Poketto Monsutā), is an upcoming Japanese anime television series that is scheduled to premiere on TV Tokyo on April 14, 2023. It is based on the games Pokémon Scarlet and Violet that were created for the Nintendo Switch. Unlike previous anime series, which followed Ash Ketchum, this show will feature new protagonists, though it was stated that Ash will make future appearances after the previous anime is over.

Premise 
The series focuses on Liko and Roy, who are accompanied by Sprigatito, Fuecoco, and Quaxly—the starter Pokémon in Pokémon Scarlet and Violet's Paldea region. Liko is from the Paldea region, while Roy is from the Kanto region of the Pokémon universe. Another character is Friede, whose partner Pokémon is Captain Pikachu.

Episodes 

<onlyinclude>

Release 
On December 16, 2022, The Pokémon Company announced that a new series of the Pokémon anime would air in Japan in 2023, following the conclusion of a special series that serves as an epilogue to Pokémon Ultimate Journeys, set to conclude the story of Ash Ketchum, the protagonist of the anime series since its beginning in 1997. The first trailer was released on March 3, 2023, announcing that the series would premiere in Japan on April 14, 2023.

References

External links 
 TV Tokyo listing 

2023 anime
2023 Japanese television seasons
2023 anime television series debuts
Pokémon anime
Upcoming anime television series